= EFLC =

EFLC may refer to:

- EFL Championship, a division of English football
- EFL Cup, or League Cup, an annual English football tournament
- Grand Theft Auto: Episodes from Liberty City, a standalone expansion for Grand Theft Auto IV
